The First Secretary of the Mordovian regional branch of the Communist Party of the Soviet Union was the position of highest authority in the Mordovian AO (1930–1934) and the Mordovian ASSR (1934–1991) in the Russian SFSR of the Soviet Union. The position was created in September 1928, and abolished in August 1991. The First Secretary was a de facto appointed position usually by the Politburo or the General Secretary himself.

List of First Secretaries of the Communist Party of Mordovia

See also
Mordovian Autonomous Soviet Socialist Republic

Notes

Sources

1928 establishments in the Soviet Union
1991 disestablishments in the Soviet Union
Regional Committees of the Communist Party of the Soviet Union
Politics of Mordovia